Ignatius Aloysius Reynolds (August 22, 1798 – March 9, 1855) was an American prelate of the Roman Catholic Church. He served as bishop of the Diocese of Charleston in the American South from 1844 until his death in 1855.

Biography

Early life 
Reynolds was born on August 22, 1798, in Bardstown, Kentucky, to John and Ann ( French) Reynolds. He enrolled at the theological seminary there at an early age. In December 1821 he entered St. Mary's Seminary in Baltimore, Maryland, where he was later ordained to the priesthood for the Archdiocese of Baltimore by Archbishop Ambrose Maréchal on October 24, 1823.

Following his return to Kentucky, Reynolds served as president of St. Joseph's College in Bardstown until 1830, when he succeeded Francis Kenrick as professor of theology at the Bardstown seminary. He also served as rector of the Cathedral of the Assumption in Louisville, Kentucky.  Reynolds later became superior of the Sisters of Charity of Nazareth, and vicar general of the diocese.

Bishop of Charleston 
On November 28, 1843, Reynolds was appointed the second bishop of the Diocese of Charleston by Pope Gregory XVI. At that time, the diocese included the states of Georgia, South Carolina, and North Carolina.  He received his episcopal consecration on March 19, 1844, from Archbishop John Purcell, with Bishops Michael O'Connor and Richard Miles serving as co-consecrators, at Saint Peter in Chains Cathedral in Cincinnati, Ohio. During his tenure Reynolds brought stability to the diocesan  administration. He conducted visitations of the entire diocese, which then included both Carolinas and Georgia.

These areas were dominated by Episcopalians, Baptists, and Methodists; there were only about 12,000 Catholics in the diocese in 1846. Reynolds published a five-volume work on his popular predecessor, Bishop John England; erased the $14,000 diocesan debt left by England, and dedicated the Cathedral of Saint John and Saint Finbar in Charleston in April 1854.

Reynolds died on March 9, 1855, at age 56 in Charleston.

References

1798 births
1855 deaths
St. Mary's Seminary and University alumni
People from Bardstown, Kentucky
Roman Catholic bishops of Charleston
19th-century Roman Catholic bishops in the United States
Catholic Church in North Carolina
Religious leaders from North Carolina
Catholics from Kentucky